Okram Henry Singh is an Indian politician from Manipur and member of the Bharatiya Janata Party. He was elected as a member of the Manipur Legislative Assembly from Wangkhei constituency in Imphal East District from the Indian National Congress in 2017 Manipur Legislative Assembly election. In 2021, he was defeated by Thangjam Arunkumar Singh with a huge margin of votes. He is the nephew of former Chief Minister of Manipur Okram Ibobi Singh.

During the 2020 Manipur vote of confidence, he was one of the eight MLAs who had skipped the assembly proceedings defying the party whip for the trust vote. He resigned from Indian National Congress and later joined Bharatiya Janata Party in presence of Ram Madhav, Baijayant Panda and Chief Minister of Manipur N. Biren Singh.

In the recent verdict declared by the High Court of Manipur, his election result was null and void.

References

Living people
Manipur MLAs 2017–2022
Manipur politicians
Bharatiya Janata Party politicians from Manipur
Year of birth missing (living people)
Indian National Congress politicians from Manipur
People from Imphal East district